Parliamentary elections were held in Montenegro on 16 October 2016. The ruling Democratic Party of Socialists (DPS) remained the largest party, winning 36 of the 81 seats, and subsequently formed a coalition government with the new Social Democrats and national minority parties. The elections were held in the midst of an alleged coup d'état attempt.

Background

Protests against incumbent Prime Minister Milo Djukanovic occurred in the preceding year over issues ranging from NATO membership to electoral fraud. A split in the ruling coalition followed in January 2016, leaving the government functioning as a de facto minority government. The provisional government of electoral trust was elected on May 12, 2016, by the parliament of Montenegro. The provisional governing coalition was formed by DPS and several opposition parties.

Electoral system
The 81 seats of the Parliament of Montenegro are elected in a single nationwide constituency by closed list proportional representation. Seats are allocated using the d'Hondt method with a 3% electoral threshold.

Minority groups that account for at least 15% of the population in a district are given an exemption that lowers the electoral threshold to 0.7% for a possible total of three seats if their list fails to cross the 3% threshold.

For ethnic Croats, if no list representing the population passes the 0.7% threshold, the list with the most votes will win one seat if it receives more than 0.35% of the vote.

Campaign
On 31 August 2016, the Democratic Serb Party (DSS) decided to sign an agreement with Democratic Front Alliance, as did the far-left Yugoslav Communist Party (JKP) and right-wing Democratic Party of Unity (DSJ).

The Socialist People's Party (SNP),  United Reform Action (URA) and DEMOS agreed to form a pre-election alliance under the name Key Coalition, with Miodrag Lekić as leader.

On 8 September 2016 the ruling Democratic Party of Socialists (DPS) decided to run independently, with two Liberal Party (LP) representatives on their electoral list.

Electoral lists

M — National minority list

Opinion polls
Poll results are listed in the table below in reverse chronological order, showing the most recent first, and using the date the survey's fieldwork was done, as opposed to the date of publication. If such date is unknown, the date of publication is given instead. The highest percentage figure in each polling survey is displayed in bold, and the background shaded in the leading party's colour. In the instance that there is a tie, then no figure is shaded. The lead column on the right shows the percentage-point difference between the two parties with the highest figures. When a specific poll does not show a data figure for a party, the party's cell corresponding to that poll is shown empty. The threshold for a party to elect members is 3%.

Coup plot

A group of 20 Serbian and Montenegrin citizens were arrested on election day. Fourteen remain in custody, including former head of Serbian Gendarmery Bratislav Dikić, and some that fought for the pro-Russian side in the War in Donbass. On 6 November, the Montenegrin prosecutor Milivoje Katnić has stated that there is no evidence of Russian state involvement, but that two Russian nationalists organized the plot. Two GRU agents, Vladimir Popov and Eduard Shishmakov, have been tried in absentia. Russian citizens in Serbia, monitoring Prime Minister Đukanović, had been supervised by the Special prosecution, which prevented them from realizing the plan. The Serbian authorities found €125,000 in cash and uniforms, and deported an unknown number of Russian citizens. At the same time, Serbian Prime Minister Aleksandar Vučić told that there had been increased activity by a number of different intelligence agencies, 'from both the East and the West', against Serbian interests, and that members of these agencies had been apprehended. The Montenegrin prosecutor said that the intention was to have 500 people enter Montenegro on election night to "cause violence", and hire assassin snipers to murder Prime Minister Đukanović – to stop Montenegro from entering NATO and prevent Russia from losing an ally in the Balkans. All opposition parties claimed that the coup attempt was staged by the Government of Montenegro and DPS as a publicity stunt to improve their electoral results, and  denounced elections as irregular, refusing to accept the results.

Results

Aftermath

Following the elections, all 39 opposition MPs boycotted Parliament from its opening due to claims of electoral fraud and the elections not being held under fair conditions. In mid-February 2017, the opposition announced it would also boycott local elections in the country's second largest municipality, Nikšić, over the government's attempt to prosecute two members of Parliament, Andrija Mandić and Milan Knežević from the right-wing opposition Democratic Front alliance, who had been charged with involvement in a coup plot allegedly planned for election day.

On 9 November 2016, Deputy Prime Minister Duško Marković in Đukanović VI Cabinet (2012-2016) was nominated as new Prime Minister by the president of Montenegro Filip Vujanović, and on 28 November new government was elected by 41 out of 81 members of the parliament (with the entire opposition boycotting the assembly), with the support of Democratic Party of Socialists, Social Democrats of Montenegro and the Bosniak, Albanian and Croatian minority parties.

References

Montenegro
Parliament
Elections in Montenegro
Montenegro